Danielle Marie Weatherholt (born March 17, 1994) is an American soccer player who currently plays as a midfielder for Angel City in the National Women's Soccer League. She played college soccer at Santa Clara University before being drafted by the Orlando Pride in the fourth-round of the 2016 NWSL College Draft.

Early life
Weatherholt was born to Doug and Gail Weatherholt in Laguna Beach, California. She was raised with her two brothers in Capistrano Beach, California, where she attended San Clemente High School. At San Clemente High School, Weatherholt played on the women's varsity soccer team for four years.

Weatherholt played club soccer for Southern California Club for nine years, seven of which she served as team captain. She played for Cal South State Team in 2011–2012 when she was ranked #5 in Southern California and #19 nationally by Top Drawer Soccer. During her time playing for Southern California Club, Weatherhiolt contributed to the acquisition of the following awards: 2011 ODP National Champions, 2011 U17 Far West Regional Champions, 2011 First Team ODP All Stars, 2011 NSCAA Youth All American Team, 2011 NSCAA High School Girls All-Region VIII Team, 2010 ODP Thanksgiving Interregional Team, 2010 U17 San Diego Surf College Cup Finalist, 2009–10 ODP Region IV Finalists and 2009–10 Region IV Champions

Playing career

Santa Clara Broncos (2012–15)
Weatherholt attended Santa Clara University from 2012 to 2015 where she majored in Liberal Studies and Pre-Teaching. During her freshman year she started all 22 games and was named to the All-WCC Honorable Mention, WCC All-Freshman team as well as to the Top Drawer Soccer Freshman Team of the Year. During her sophomore year she played in all 22 games and helped the Broncos to the Round of 16 of the 2013 NCAA Division I Women's Soccer Tournament.
Her junior year saw her start all 20 games for he Broncos where she was named All-WCC Honorable Mention and WCC All-Academic Honorable Mention. Weatherholt started all 21 games of her senior year.  She once again made the WCC All-Academic Honorable Mention as well as the Third Team All-West Region, First Team All-WCC and NSCAA Scholar Second Team All-West Region.

Orlando Pride (2016–2019)
In January 2016, Weatherholt was selected by Orlando Pride in the fourth-round (31st overall pick) of the 2016 NWSL College Draft. She signed with the club in April 2016.  She went on to play 12 appearances her first year at the club.  She had her contract option exercised for the 2017 season where she made 19 appearances and scored one goal.  She was offered a new contract for the 2018 season. During that season Weatherholt played 23 games for the club, tied for the most in the season for any Orlando Pride player alongside Shelina Zadorsky. Her contract option exercised for the 2019 season.

Loan to Melbourne Victory (2018–2019)

On October 16, 2018, the Melbourne Victory announced they had signed Weatherholt on loan for the 2018–2019 W-League season. She made 12 appearances as the team won the Premiership title, marking Weatherholt's first professional trophy.

Reign FC (2020–2021)
On January 22, 2020, Weatherholt was traded to Reign FC in exchange for Reign's natural second-round pick in the 2021 NWSL College Draft.

Angel City FC (2022–)
Weatherholt got selected by Angel City FC in the 2022 NWSL Expansion Draft She was named to the team's 25 player preseason roster before the 2022 Season.

International career
In April 2015, Weatherholt was called up to the United States women's national under-23 soccer team training camp.

Career statistics

Honors

Club 
Melbourne Victory
W-League Premiership: 2018–19

References

External links
 Orlando Pride player profile
 Santa Clara player profile
 US Soccer player profile

1994 births
Living people
American women's soccer players
National Women's Soccer League players
Orlando Pride draft picks
Orlando Pride players
OL Reign players
People from Laguna Beach, California
People from San Clemente, California
Santa Clara Broncos women's soccer players
Soccer players from California
Sportspeople from Orange County, California
Women's association football midfielders
American expatriate women's soccer players
Expatriate women's soccer players in Australia
American expatriate sportspeople in Australia
People from Dana Point, California
Melbourne Victory FC (A-League Women) players
Angel City FC players